Greenwood Mall (Kentucky), in Bowling Green, Kentucky
 Greenwood Mall (South Carolina), formerly Crosscreek Mall, in Greenwood, South Carolina